La Grange is a small unincorporated community in rural Stanislaus County, California.  Its altitude is 249 feet (76 m). As of 2008 it has a population of 345. It is located at  (37.6635433, -120.4635289) along the Tuolumne River, and is near the La Grange Dam and the New Don Pedro Dam.

History

The name is French and means "the barn" or "the farm".  The community and a French settlement nearby were also called "French Bar".  The community was founded in 1852 around the same time French miners struck gold on a bar in the Tuolumne River.  By 1854, there were over 100 buildings in La Grange.

La Grange became the county seat of Stanislaus County in 1856.  Aside from its French population, the community included a significant Chinatown in its early years.  At its height, the community had thousands of residents, but it was a largely lawless town.  It was in decline by the time that Knights Ferry became the county seat, as the gold mines were in decline.  By 1880, mining had ceased.  The La Grange area also included many gold dredgers that operated until the early 1950s.

On June 3, 1869, John Muir departed Legrange (French Bar) with a sheep herder and a flock of sheep and headed for the headwaters of the Merced and Tuolumne rivers. Muir writes famously of this in his book “My First Summer in the Sierra”. In chapter one, Muir describes leaving French Bar and moving with the flock into the hills near Coulterville. He writes, “This morning provisions, camp-kettles, blankets, plant-press, etc., were packed on two horses, the flock headed for the tawny foothills, and away we sauntered in a cloud of dust: Mr. Delaney, bony and tall, with sharply hacked profile like Don Quixote, leading the pack-horses, Billy, the proud shepherd, a Chinaman and a Digger Indian to assist in driving for the first few days in the brushy foothills, and myself with notebook tied to my belt. The home ranch from which we set out is on the south side of the Tuolumne River near French Bar, where the foothills of metamorphic gold-bearing slates dip below the stratified deposits of the Central Valley”. In many ways, this experience moves him so much that he writes eloquently of the Yosemite area. His books are read by Americans including President Theodore Roosevelt. Muir becomes the face of a new conservation movement to save Yosemite and create Yosemite National Park.</ref> “My First Summer In The Sierra”, by John Muir - HOUGHTON MIFFLIN COMPANY 1917

Historic district
La Grange is now a registered California Historical Landmark historic district. Today, a post office, a supermarket, an elementary school (as of fall, 2015, after a brief stint as a charter school, the public school was closed), and a high school (Don Pedro High School) still operate in La Grange. Also functioning is the oldest church in Stanislaus County, St. Louis Roman Catholic Church, with a cemetery containing tombstones dating to the mid-1800s.

See also
California Historical Landmarks in Stanislaus County, California
Modesto metropolitan area

Notes

External links

Unincorporated communities in Stanislaus County, California
Historic districts in California
Populated places established in 1852
California Historical Landmarks
Unincorporated communities in California
1852 establishments in California